was a feudal domain under the Tokugawa shogunate of Edo period Japan, in what is now western Ehime Prefecture on the island of Shikoku. It was centered around Ōzu Castle, and was ruled throughout its history by the tozama daimyō Katō clan. Ōzu Domain was dissolved in the abolition of the han system in 1871 and is now part of Ehime Prefecture.

History
In the early Edo period, Ōzu was part of the territory of Tōdō Takatora, who had rebuilt Ōzu Castle. In 1608, the Tokugawa shogunate promoted him to Tsu Domain in Ise Province and created the 53,000 koku Ōzu Domain for Wakisaka Yasuharu from Sumoto Domain on Awaji island.  In 1617, his son Yasumoto was transferred to Iida Domain in Shinano Province and Ōzu was reassigned to Katō Sadayasu from Yonago Domain, with an increased kokudaka to 66,000 koku. Sadayasu died suddenly in 1623 without formally having appointed an heir, which would normally be cause for attainder; however, his eldest son Katō Yasuaki managed to secure an audience with Shogun Tokugawa Hidetada and was accepted as heir. However, the shogunate also allowed his younger brother, Katō Naoyasu, to carve out a 10,000 koku portion of the estate and to establish Niiya Domain and a cadet brach of the clan. This move was vehemently opposed by Ōzu Domain, and relations between the two branches of the clan was hostile for the next two centuries. Niiya Domain was left in the ambitious position of both being a subsidiary domain of Ōzu and a direct domain under the shogunate.

The Katō clan cultivated a reputation for scholarship. The noted Confucian scholar Nakae Tōju spent his early career as a retainer of the Katō. The domain was also a sponsor of nascent kokugaku studies and expressed strong loyalty to the Imperial house, even from the early Edo Period. In the Bakumatsu period, the domain fought on the imperial side in the 1868 Battle of Toba-Fushimi. Although relatively small domain, it played a large role in Bakumatsu period events. The steamship used by Sakamoto Ryoma's Kaientai, the Iroha-maru, was owned by Ōzu Domain. With the 1871 abolition of the han system Ōzu Domain became "Ōzu Prefecture" and merged with "Uwajima Prefecture" before becoming part of Ehime Prefecture. The Kato clan was awarded the title of viscount user the kazoku peerage system in 1884.

Holdings at the end of the Edo period
As with most domains in the han system, Ōzu Domain consisted of several discontinuous territories calculated to provide the assigned kokudaka, based on periodic cadastral surveys and projected agricultural yields.

Iyo Province  
5 villages in Kazahaya District
49 villages in Ukena District
17 villages in Iyo District
80 villages in Kita District

List of daimyō 

{| class=wikitable
! #||Name || Tenure || Courtesy title || Court Rank || kokudaka 
|-
|colspan=6|  Wakizaka clan, 1609-1617 (Tozama)
|-
||1||||1609–1615||Awaji-no-kami (淡路守)|| Junior 5th Rank, Lower Grade (従五位下)||53,000 koku 
|-
||2||||1615–1617||Awaji-no-kami (淡路守)|| Junior 5th Rank, Lower Grade (従五位下)||53,000 koku 
|-
|colspan=6|  Katō clan, 1617-1871 (Tozama)
|-
||1||||1617–1623||Saemon-no-jō (左衛門尉);  Sakon-no-taifu (左近大夫)|| Junior 5th Rank, Lower Grade (従五位下)||66,000 koku  
|-
||2||||1623–1674||Dewa-no-kami (出羽守)|| Junior 5th Rank, Lower Grade (従五位下)||66,000 koku  
|-
||3||||1674–1715||Tōtōmi-no-kami (遠江守)|| Junior 5th Rank, Lower Grade (従五位下)||66,000 koku  
|-
|4||||1715–1727||Dewa-no-kami (出羽守)|| Junior 5th Rank, Lower Grade (従五位下)||66,000 koku  
|-
||5||||1727–1745||Tōtōmi-no-kami (遠江守)|| Junior 5th Rank, Lower Grade (従五位下)||66,000 koku  
|-
||6||||1745–1762||Dewa-no-kami (出羽守)|| Junior 5th Rank, Lower Grade (従五位下)||66,000 koku  
|-
||7||||1762–1768||Dewa-no-kami (出羽守)|| Junior 5th Rank, Lower Grade (従五位下)||66,000 koku  
|-
||8||||1768–1769||Dewa-no-kami (出羽守)|| Junior 5th Rank, Lower Grade (従五位下)||66,000 koku  
|-
||9||||1769–1787||Tōtōmi-no-kami (遠江守)|| Junior 5th Rank, Lower Grade (従五位下)||66,000 koku  
|-
||10||||1787–1826||Tōtōmi-no-kami (遠江守)|| Junior 5th Rank, Lower Grade (従五位下)||66,000 koku  
|-
||11||||1826–1853||Tōtōmi-no-kami (遠江守)|| Junior 5th Rank, Lower Grade (従五位下)||66,000 koku  
|-
||12||||1853–1864||Dewa-no-kami (出羽守)|| Junior 5th Rank, Lower Grade (従五位下)||66,000 koku  
|-
||13||||1864–1871||Tōtōmi-no-kami (遠江守)|| Junior 4th Rank, Lower Grade (従四位下)||66,000 koku  
||-
|}

See also

 List of Han
 Abolition of the han system

References 

Domains of Japan
History of Ehime Prefecture
Iyo Province
Shikoku region
1608 establishments in Japan
States and territories established in 1608
1871 disestablishments in Japan
States and territories disestablished in 1871